Maha Senanurak (March 29, 1773 – July 16, 1817) was a Viceroy appointed by Buddha Loetla Nabhalai as the titular heir to the throne was the brother to the king. Maha Senanurak was known for his leadership of the Siamese campaign against the Burmese invasion of Thalang in 1809.

Early life
Chui was born to Chao Phraya Chakri (future King Phutthayotfa Chulalok or Rama I) and his wife Nak (future Queen Amarindra) in 1773. In 1782, Chao Phraya Chakri crowned himself as the first monarch of the Chakri dynasty of Siam at Bangkok. Chui was then made a prince. He was later awarded the title Krom Khun Senanurak. Prince Senanurak was known to be close to his only true brother Prince and Front Palace Isarasundhorn (future Buddha Loetla Nabhalai or Rama II). In 1807 Prince Isarasundhorn made his brother Prince Senanurak his successor to the Front Palace. In 1809, King Phutthayotfa Chulalok died. As a result, the Front Palace Isarasundhorn ascended the throne as King. The new King appointed Prince Senanurak as the next the Front Palace lord, and as his successor.

Countering the Burmese invasions

In 1809 King Bodawpaya of Burma sent his troops to invade Thalang (modern Phuket.) Buddha Loetla Nabhalai sent Maha Senanurak to counter this invasion. Around the same time Prince Kasatranuchit, a son of King Taksin of Thonburi and his sister Princess Chimyai, staged a rebellion to reclaim the throne. The rebellion was quickly suppressed by Prince Jessadabodindra (future King Rama III). Maha Senanurak's wife, Princess Samleewan, a daughter of Taksin, was executed for treason.

Death
Senanurak fell ill and died in 1817. For the rest of his reign King Rama II refused to appoint a new Front Palace, perhaps leading to the brief confusion in the succession between his sons Chetsadabodin and Mongkut after his death in 1824.

References

1773 births
1817 deaths
18th-century Thai women
18th-century Chakri dynasty
19th-century Thai women
19th-century Chakri dynasty
Front Palaces
Thai male Chao Fa
Sons of kings
Non-inheriting heirs presumptive